The 2017–18 Mauritian Premier League season is the 38th season of top-flight football in Mauritius. The season started on 26 November 2017 and finished on 20 May 2018.

Final standings

See also
2018 Mauritian Cup

References

Mauritian Premier League seasons
Mauritius
Prem
Prem